Makkala Bhagya is a 1976 Indian Kannada-language film, directed by K. S. L. Swamy (Ravi) and produced by K. Vittal Kumar and K. V. Honnappa. The film stars Vishnuvardhan, Bharathi Vishnuvardhan, K. S. Ashwath and Dwarakish in the lead roles. The film has musical score by Vijaya Bhaskar. It is a remake of the Tamil movie Kuzhandaiyum Deivamum, which itself was an adaptation of the 1953 British film Twice Upon a Time and the 1961 movie The Parent Trap – both based on the Erich Kästner's 1949 German novel Lottie and Lisa (Das doppelte Lottchen).

Cast 

Vishnuvardhan
Bharathi Vishnuvardhan
K. S. Ashwath
Dwarakish
Sampath
Thoogudeepa Srinivas
Chethan
Lokesh
Leelavathi (actress)
B. V. Radha
M. N. Lakshmidevi
B. Jaya
Shubha in Guest Appearance
Udayachandrika in Guest Appearance
Gangadhar in Guest Appearance
Hanumanthachar in Guest Appearance
Baby Indira

Soundtrack 
"O Gelati Nannane" - S. B. Balasubrahmanyam, Vani Jairam
"Amma Ondu Maneyalli" - L. R. Anjali

References

External links 
 
 

1976 films
1970s Kannada-language films
Twins in Indian films
Films scored by Vijaya Bhaskar
Kannada remakes of Tamil films
Films based on Lottie and Lisa
Indian children's films
Films directed by K. S. L. Swamy